Deshawon Nembhard (born 8 October 1994) is a Belizean footballer who plays as a defender for South Georgia Tormenta in USL League One.

Career

College
Nembhard began playing college soccer at Southern Methodist University in 2013, before transferring after his freshman year. From 2014, Nembhard played at Florida International University, including a redshirt year in 2016.

FC Miami City
In 2018, Nembhard played in the fourth-tier USL PDL with FC Miami City, making 4 league appearances and scoring a single goal.

Charleston Battery
On 10 February 2020, Nembhard signed with USL Championship side Charleston Battery. He made his professional debut on 19 July 2020, starting in a 2–1 loss to Birmingham Legion.

Stumptown AC
Nembhard played the 2021 season with Stumptown AC of the National Independent Soccer Association.

South Georgia Tormenta
On 9 February 2022, Nembhard signed with USL League One club South Georgia Tormenta.

International career
On 18 February 2021, Nembhard was called-up to the Belize national football team. He made his debut on 25 March 2021 in a World Cup qualifier against Haiti.

References

External links
 NISA profile

1994 births
Living people
People from Corozal Town
Belizean footballers
Belize international footballers
Association football defenders
Belizean emigrants to the United States
Naturalized citizens of the United States
Soccer players from Dallas
American soccer players
SMU Mustangs men's soccer players
FIU Panthers men's soccer players
FC Miami City players
Charleston Battery players
USL Championship players
USL League Two players
African-American soccer players
American people of Belizean descent
21st-century African-American sportspeople
Stumptown AC players
National Independent Soccer Association players
Tormenta FC players